Jiangyin is a county-level city on the southern bank of the Yangtze River, and is administered by Wuxi, Jiangsu province. Jiangyin is one of the most important transport hubs on the Yangtze River, it is also one of the most developed counties in China. With 1,595,138 inhabitants as of the 2010 census,[1] the city is now part of Jiangyin-Zhangjiagang-Jingjiang built-up or metropolitan area with 3,526,260 inhabitants

Etymology 
Jiangyin's name means "River Shade", from its location on the south or shady side of the Yangtze River.

History

Jiangyin was a township of Yanling (later known as Piling) county initially. Since the township was located in the north of Ji Lake, it was given the name "Jiyang". In 281, it was promoted as a county of Piling commandery. In 558,  the north-west part was taken away from then Lanling county (Wujin and its around areas) to create Jiangyin county. It was served as the seat of Jiangyin commandery, of which jurisdiction equating to the modern city's, until the commandery was dissolved in 589. It was elevated to jun (military prefecture) status during Southern Tang, until being restored as a county of Changzhou in 1071. It developed as an important port for overseas trades, and a Maritime Trade Supervisorate was established to manage in 1145. The county became a zhou (smaller prefecture) during Yuan dynasty, but was reduced to county status again in 1367.

In 1472, the sandbank in the Yangtze River was independent from the county to establish Jingjiang county. In 1645, the draconian enforcement of the decree adopting the Manchu hair style and dress inflamed the local Han Chinese people's spirit to resist. Since the ultimatum "either lose your hair or lose your head" was given, they held the walled city against Qing sieges under a magistrate Yan Yingyuan 's leadership.

On 23 April 1987, Jiangyin was approved by the State Council of China to become a county-level city.

Administrative divisions
In the present, Jiangyin City has 5 subdistricts and 11 towns.
5 subdistricts

11 towns

Transport

Rail 
Jiangyin Train Ferry Line is the only one remains across the Yangtze River, it is a part of the Xinyi–Changxing Railway.

A new high-speed railway line has been proposed that would link Jiangyin directly to both Shanghai and Nanjing. Furthermore, it will be connected to Wuxi by an extension to the existing Wuxi Metro.

Climate

Notable people
Li Jinjun, Chinese (PRC) Ambassador to North Korea (DPRK) (from 2015)
Liu Bannong (1891–1934) - writer
Liu Tianhua (1895–1932) - musician and composer
Miao Quansun (1844–1919) - Academic, catalog writer, bibliophile, founder of modern Chinese librarianship
Shangguan Yunzhu - movie star
Xu Xiake (1587–1641) - noted traveller and geographer
Yu Minhong - Chairman and President of New Oriental Education & Technology Group

See also 
Jiangyin Yangtze River Bridge
Huaxi Village

Notes

References

External links
Official Site
Jiangyin: An Example of China's Modern Cities
Jiangyin Online
Jiangyin Port
Jiangyin City English guide (Jiangsu.NET)
3D map of Jiangyin in Chinese
www.virtualtourist.com - Jiangyin - Travel Guide

 
Cities in Jiangsu
County-level divisions of Jiangsu
Wuxi
Populated places on the Yangtze River